The 1990–91 NSL Cup was the fifteenth season of the NSL Cup, which was the main national association football knockout cup competition in Australia. 14 teams from around Australia entered the competition.

Round of 16

Quarter-finals

Semi-finals

Final

References

NSL Cup
NSL Cup
1990 in Australian soccer
1991 in Australian soccer
NSL Cup seasons